Khin Htay Kywe is a Burmese politician and former political prisoner, and currently serves as Mon State Hluttaw MP for Chaungzon Township. In the 1990 Burmese general election, she was elected as an Pyithu Hluttaw MP, winning a majority of 18,307 (80% of the votes), but was never allowed to assume her seat.

She attended the State High School No. 3 Tamwe and graduated from the Rangoon Arts and Science University in 1970 with a BS degree in zoology. In 1978, she became a lawyer.

References

Members of Pyithu Hluttaw
National League for Democracy politicians
Prisoners and detainees of Myanmar
1946 births
Living people
People from Mon State
University of Yangon alumni